Serhiy Ivanovych Kovalets (born 5 September 1968) is a Ukrainian former football midfielder and current manager of Inhulets Petrove.

Playing career
Kovalets played 10 matches for Ukraine between 1992 and 1994.

Coaching career
After he retired from playing football, Metalist Kharkiv head coach Myron Markevych invited Kovalets to work with him as an assistant coach in 2005. In 2008, Kovalets became the head coach of the newly promoted FC Lviv, who had an unsuccessful start in the Ukrainian Premier League. Kovalets failed to accomplish his task of keeping his team in the Premier League, which ended up losing to Illichivets in goal difference.

At the end of August 2009, Kovalets became the new head coach of PFC Oleksandria in the Ukrainian First League. He held this position until Yuriy Maksymov left Obolon during the winter break of 2009–10 Ukrainian Premier League season when he was offered the position. He was sacked after a 1–0 defeat at Chornomorets Odesa on 31 November. On 18 January 2012, Kovalets was appointed as the new manager of 1. FC Tatran Prešov.

Personal life
Kovalets was born in Chekhove, Crimean Oblast, Ukrainian SSR, Soviet Union, now Ukraine. He is married since 1988. Together with his wife Anzhela has three children: daughters Alina (1989) and Daryna (1998) and also one son, current professional footballer Kyrylo (1993).

Honours

Player
 Soviet Top League Champion: 1990
 USSR Cup: 1990
 Ukrainian Premier League Champion: 1992–93
 Ukrainian Premier League Champion: 1993–94
 Ukrainian Cup: 1993

Coach
Winner (1): Commonwealth of Independent States Cup: 2014
Runner Up (1): Commonwealth of Independent States Cup: 2013

References

External links

 Biography 
 

1968 births
Living people
People from Rozdolne Raion
Soviet footballers
Ukrainian footballers
Ukraine international footballers
Association football midfielders
FC Dynamo Kyiv players
FC Dnipro players
FC Chornomorets Odesa players
FC Twente players
FC Karpaty Lviv players
FC Karpaty-2 Lviv players
FC Metalurh Zaporizhzhia players
FC Metalurh-2 Zaporizhzhia players
FC Obolon-Brovar Kyiv players
FC Obolon-2 Kyiv players
FC Krasyliv players
FC Podillya Khmelnytskyi players
FC Volyn Lutsk players
FC Borysfen Boryspil players
Soviet Top League players
Soviet Second League players
Ukrainian Premier League players
Ukrainian First League players
Ukrainian Second League players
Ukrainian expatriate footballers
Expatriate footballers in the Netherlands
Ukrainian expatriate sportspeople in the Netherlands
Ukrainian football managers
FC Lviv managers
FC Oleksandriya managers
FC Obolon Kyiv managers
1. FC Tatran Prešov managers
FC Metalurh Zaporizhzhia managers
Ukraine national under-21 football team managers
FK Riteriai managers
FC Chornomorets Odesa managers
FC Inhulets Petrove managers
Ukrainian Premier League managers
Ukrainian First League managers
Slovak Super Liga managers
A Lyga managers
Ukrainian expatriate football managers
Expatriate football managers in Slovakia
Ukrainian expatriate sportspeople in Slovakia
Expatriate football managers in Lithuania
Ukrainian expatriate sportspeople in Lithuania